Bramberg am Wildkogel is a municipality in the district of Zell am See (Pinzgau region), in the state of Salzburg, Austria.

History
In ancient times, the area around Bramberg was a copper-ore mining center. Belonging to the municipality Leitengut, Bramberg was mentioned in 925 as the oldest parish in the upper Salzachtal river valley and in 1160 was named as "Prentenperige" for the first time. The mining was taken up again in 1829 and finally abandoned in 1863. Attempts at mining again in the 20th century later failed.

Also the famous emerald mines in Habachtal, alongside Norway and Italy, are the only emerald mine locations in Europe.

Coat of arms
The crest shows: "In blue two towering battlements of silver, and at the sign above the left edge of offensive. From the right side of the higher pinnacle comes a golden horse. "It is a representation of the old war-horse Fjuri of the Knight Bart from Küniglberg. The horse was, in 1376, ridden after a wild night with Knight Bart in the Wildkogel area, and by a miracle, after several days and then plated back to one of the richest gold mines in the Hohe Tauern. The Knight Bart, however, was never seen again.

Localities

These are the localities in the municipality:

 Bicheln
 Bramberg
 Dorf
 Habach

 Leiten
 Mühlbach
 Mühlberg

 Schönbach
 Schweinegg
 Sonnegg

 Steinach
 Wenns
 Weyer

Politics
The City Council is composed of the following parties:

 10 ÖVP
   9 SPÖ
   2 BBL (Bramberger Burgerliste)

The directly elected Bürgermeister is Walter Freiberger (SPÖ).

Transport 
The federal road, the Bundesstraße 165, runs east–west through the municipality. Public transport is provided by bus services of the Salzburger Verkehrsverbund as well as rail services on the Pinzgauer Lokalbahn, which has a junction at Zell am See to the Austrian main line network. There are also post buses to Krimml and Zell am See.

Culture and places of interest

Museums 
 Local history museum

Sport 
 Wildkogel ski area on the Wildkogel
 Cable car to the Wildkogel (Smaragdbahn, opened December 2010)
 Floodlit toboggan run (at 14 km one of the longest floodlit runs in the world)
 Floodlit cross-country skiing and skating runs
 Swimming pool and large children's play park
 Flying school for paragliding and hang gliding

See also
 Salzburg
 Salzburgerland

References

External links 

 Municipal website

Kitzbühel Alps
Venediger Group
Cities and towns in Zell am See District